Events from the year 1795 in Canada.

Incumbents
Monarch: George III

Federal government
Parliament of Lower Canada — 1st
Parliament of Upper Canada — 1st

Governors
Governor of the Canadas: Guy Carleton, 1st Baron Dorchester
Governor of New Brunswick: Thomas Carleton
Governor of Nova Scotia: John Wentworth
Commodore-Governor of Newfoundland: John Elliot
Governor of St. John's Island: Edmund Fanning
Governor of Upper Canada: John Graves Simcoe

Events

 1790s – British create protective tariffs to encourage timber production for Navy after Napoléon Bonaparte cuts off Baltic supply of tall trees and hardwood. First in New Brunswick then in Lower and Upper Canada. Montreal merchants expand transport to handle trade.
 A road Act is passed, in Lower Canada, though opposed by country people, who fear a return of the Statue labor of Governor Haldimand's time.

Births
 September 5: Étienne-Paschal Taché, doctor, politician, and deputy adjutant-general of the militia (died 1865)
 September 30: François Norbert Blanchet, missionary (died 1883)

Deaths
 May 18: Robert Rogers, army officer and author (born 1731)

 
Canada
95